Doab Rural District is a rural district (dehestan) in the Central District of Selseleh County, Lorestan Province, Iran. At the 2006 census, its population was 5,486, in 1,053 families.  The rural district has 52 villages.

References 

Rural Districts of Lorestan Province
Selseleh County